Fox River (Ninaġvik in Inupiaq) is a waterway on the Seward Peninsula in the U.S. state of Alaska. The Fox flows eastward for  before reaching the Fish River from the west.

Geography
In the lower  of its course, it has a very sinuous channel filled with sand
and gravel bars, making the water shallow and navigation for small boats difficult. Above this portion, the valley narrows down and the river channel has nearly a straight course. The gradient of the valley from the head of the river to the mouth is very slight. The river bed itself is a broad expanse of gravel and sand bars, not entirely covered by water. The bed rock consists of a series of light-gray chloritic micaceous schists, interbedded with which are limestone and graphitic schists. Sills and dikes of rather massive greenstone are very generally distributed along the creek. The alluvium includes pebbles derived from bed fock, light micaceous sands, and in some places quicksands.

Tributaries
Some prospecting has been done near the mouth of I X L Gulch in the margin of one of the many benches common along the Fox River valley. Preparations were being made in 1908 for working claims here on a more economical scale with water brought in a ditch from another tributary of Fox River, known as Blue Rock Creek. I X L Gulch is a small tributary which heads about a mile southwest of Fox River. Slate Creek is another tributary, from the south.

Geology
They consist of labradorite and olivine phenocrysts in a groundmass of plagtoclase, augite, and biotite. Some greenstone masses which appeared to be slightly altered tuffs were found in the divide between Fox and Solomon rivers.

References

Rivers of the Seward Peninsula
Rivers of Alaska
Rivers of Northwest Arctic Borough, Alaska
Rivers of Nome Census Area, Alaska
Rivers of Unorganized Borough, Alaska